The 2013 Tulsa Golden Hurricane football team represented the University of Tulsa in the 2013 NCAA Division I FBS football season. They were led by third-year head coach Bill Blankenship and played their home games at Skelly Field at H. A. Chapman Stadium. This was Tulsa's final season as a member of Conference USA (C-USA). Tulsa moved to the American Athletic Conference the following year. Tulsa had an overall record of 3–9 on the season with a 2–6 mark in conference to finish in sixth place in the C-USA West Division.

Schedule

Game summaries

at Bowling Green

Colorado State

at Oklahoma

Iowa State

Rice

at UTEP

at Tulane

UTSA

at East Carolina

Marshall

at Louisiana Tech

North Texas

References

Tulsa
Tulsa Golden Hurricane football seasons
Tulsa Golden Hurricane football